Abdesselem Ben Mohammed (15 June 1926 - 1965) was a footballer who played as a striker. He played for Wydad in Morocco where he won several domestic championships, before playing in France with Bordeaux and Nîmes. Born in Morocco, Ben Mohammed represented the France national team.

International career
Ben Mohammed was born in the French Protectorate in Morocco. He represented the France national team in a 1-0 1954 FIFA World Cup qualification win over Ireland on 25 November 1953.

Honours
Wydad
Botola: 1947-48, 1948-49, 1949-50, 1950-51
North African Championship: 1947-48, 1948-49, 1949-50
North African Cup: 1948-49

Nîmes
Coupe Charles Drago: 1955-56

References

External links
 FFF Profile
 FDB Profile
 NFT Profile

1926 births
1965 deaths
Footballers from Casablanca
French footballers
France international footballers
Moroccan footballers
Moroccan emigrants to France
Wydad AC players
FC Girondins de Bordeaux players
Botola players
Ligue 1 players
Association football forwards